Arthur Bryant Triggs (30 January 1868 – 9 September 1936) was an Australian grazier and collector.

Family life
Triggs was born in Chelsea, London, the son of James Triggs, carpet agent, and his wife Celia Anne, née Bryant. His younger brother was Inigo Triggs, the English country house architect and garden designer and author. The architect Inigo Jones was a distant relative.

Career
In 1887 Arthur immigrated to Australia, becoming a wealthy New South Wales grazier (known as The Sheep King) and collector of art, books and coins.

Further reading
Jitts, Stephe (2015). Arthur Bryant Triggs: Pastoralist, Philanthropist, Collector. .

External links
Australian Dictionary of Biography – Arthur Bryant Triggs
Tracking A.B. Triggs and his collections article by Alan Ives, in "MARGIN: Life & Letters in Early Australia", Nov, 2003.

1868 births
1936 deaths
Australian sheep breeders
English emigrants to Australia
Australian book and manuscript collectors